BlogML is an open format derived from XML to store and restore the content of a blog.

History 

BlogML was originally created by Darren Neimke in August 2005 by starting a Workspace on GotDotNet community.  In July 2006, BlogML was moved to CodePlex for better open-source development and some other developers joined this project.  BlogML has hit three versions so far.  Versions 0.9 and 1.0 released on GotDotNet and version 2.0 released on CodePlex.  After moving this project to CodePlex, Keyvan Nayyeri joined this project and added some new features for BlogML 2.0.

In addition to BlogML specification, there is a rich set of .NET Framework APIs provided by the BlogML team for .NET developers to work with markup easier.

BlogML is supported by many .NET blogging tools such as Community Server, Subtext, Single User Blog, BlogEngine.NET, DasBlog and the Orchard Project.  Also there are some implementations for other blogging engines and services such as Blogger.

Main goals 

BlogML is created for some main goals:

 Ability to port blog content between Blog Engines:
This is the case where one has a blog based on .Text version 0.95 and wants to upgrade to Community Server.  Having an "Export to BlogML" in .Text and an "Import from BlogML" function in Community Server solves this problem.
 Ability to port blog content between Blog Engine Versions:
Same as above.
 Ability to port blog content between Storage Providers:
This is the case where one might be using a blogging engine such as Single User Blog and is running from one provider - such as DotTextProvider (where the content reads and writes to an existing .Text schema) and wants to continue to use Single User Blog but move to a new data structure.  In this case one configures Single User Blog to use the DotTextProvider and run an "Export to BlogML" function, then re-configure the provider to thenative provider and run the "Import from BlogML" function.
 Ability to easily back-up a blog:
Here one run some sort of scheduled job to automatically run the "Export to BlogML" function and save the output as a compressed backup file somewhere.

License 

BlogML is licensed under BSD license.

References

External links
 BlogML

Web syndication formats
XML-based standards
Computer file formats